Arpachin, is a village (Khutor) in Bagayevsky District of Rostov Oblast, Russia. It is located on the left bank of the Don River. Population: 1,469 (2010 Census), ;

Arpachin was founded in 1757 by Ivan Manotskov.

External links 

 Genealogy of Strukachev family (from khutor Arpachin) 
 Letter of peasant P.I.Dukha from a village Arpachin from (17 March 1924)

References

Notes

Rural localities in Rostov Oblast